Isopogon uncinatus, commonly known as Albany cone bush, is a species of flowering plant in the family Proteaceae and is endemic to a restricted area near Albany in Western Australia. It is a small shrub with very short stems, linear to egg-shaped leaves with the narrower end towards the base, and spherical heads of yellowish flowers. It is the rarest isopogon and was thought to be extinct until rediscovered in the 1980s.

Description
The flowers are arranged in sessile, spherical heads  in diameter, surrounded by clusters of leaves near the base of the plant.

Taxonomy
Isopogon uncinatus was first formally described in 1830 by Robert Brown in the Supplementum to his Prodromus Florae Novae Hollandiae et Insulae Van Diemen from material collected by William Baxter at King George's Sound. The specific epithet (uncinatus) means "hooked".

Distribution and habitat
Albany cone bush grows in stunted jarrah scrub in swampy depression and on hillslopes near Albany where it is only known from nine small populations.

Conservation status
This is the rarest isopogon and was thought to be extinct until rediscovered in the 1980s. It is listed as "critically endangered" under the Australian Government Environment Protection and Biodiversity Conservation Act 1999 and as "Threatened Flora (Declared Rare Flora — Extant)" by the Department of Environment and Conservation (Western Australia). The main threats to the species are disease caused by Phytophthora cinnamomi, inappropriate fire regimes and drought.

References

uncinatus
Endemic flora of Southwest Australia
Eudicots of Western Australia
Plants described in 1830
Taxa named by Robert Brown (botanist, born 1773)